Bassekou Kouyaté (born 1966) is a musician from Mali. His band is known as Ngoni ba.
 
He was born into the Kouyate family in Garana, Barouéli Cercle, 60 kilometres from Ségou, in 1966. At the age of 12, he started playing the ngoni. In the late 1980s he moved to the capital, Bamako.

Kouyaté's debut album, Segu Blue, was released internationally in 2007 by Outhere Records and distributed in the U.K. by Proper Music Distribution. The album was produced by Lucy Durán. He has also appeared on a number of albums by Toumani Diabaté and has performed in several European countries. In 2010, Kouyaté toured with Béla Fleck.

Kouyaté's wife, Amy Sacko, is also a successful solo artist and sings lead in his band. His father, Mustapha Kouyaté, was a ngoni player and his mother Yagaré Damba was a praise singer.

Kouyate, together with Amy Sacko and Ngoni ba, appeared at The 2013 Proms.

Discography 

Albums
 Bassekou Kouyaté & Ngoni Ba: Segu Blue (Outhere Records, 2007)
 Bassekou Kouyaté & Ngoni Ba: I Speak Fula (Outhere Records, 2009)
 Bassekou Kouyaté & Ngoni Ba: Jama Ko (Outhere Records, 2013)
 Bassekou Kouyaté & Ngoni Ba: Ba Power (Glitterbeat Records, 2015)
 Bassekou Kouyaté & Ngoni Ba: Miri (Outhere Records, 2019)

Contributing artist
 The Rough Guide To Desert Blues (World Music Network, 2010)

Filmography 
 2008: Throw Down Your Heart, by Sascha Paladino: Himself
 2013: The Africa Express, by Renaud Barret and Florent de La Tullaye: Himself
 2016: Easy Man, by Jasper Cremers and Dennis de Groot: Himself
 2016: Mali Blues, by Lutz Gregor: Himself

Awards 
2008 – BBC Radio 3 Awards for World Music – Album of the Year & African Artist of the Year

References 

More from Mali: Review. African Business,  January 2008.
mali-music.com: Bassekou Kouyaté. The prince of the strings. 15 January 2004.

External links 
 
Outhere Records
Bassekou Kouyaté on Facebook

1966 births
Living people
Malian musicians
Ngoni players
People from Ségou Region
21st-century Malian people